Marocco may refer to:

 Marrakech, a major city in Morocco, North Africa
 Marocco (see), its former Roman Catholic diocese and present Latin Catholic titular see  
 Bankes's Horse, a famous English 'dancing/politic/thinking' show equine

See also 
 Morocco (disambiguation)